The 1981 John Player All England Open Badminton Championships was the 71st edition of the event.
It was held between March 25 and March 29, 1981, in London.

Final results

Men's singles

Seeds

Section 1

Section 2

Women's singles

Seeds

Section 1

Section 2

Men's doubles

Women's doubles

Mixed doubles

References

All England Open Badminton Championships
All England Open
All England
All England Badminton Championships
All England Badminton Championships
All England Open Badminton Championships in London